Direh may refer to:
 Direh, North Khorasan
 Direh Rural District, in Kermanshah Province